The Opening of the South-North route was symbolized by the passage of the ship Liming from Zhanjiang, Guangdong to Qingdao, Shandong on 5 April 1968. Mainland China resumed using its own ships to carry out sea transportation and shipping between its north and south ports.

In 1949, after the cross-strait split and the PRC participating in the Korean war, the ROC with support of the US government began military blockades of the Taiwan strait. This was part of the Guanbi policy. The PRC, unable to launch a military counterattack, could only hire foreign ships to carry out shipping, thus disrupting the shipping of its own ships between the northern and southern ports on the Chinese mainland.

In May 1966, premier Zhou Enlai of the State council approved the report of the Ministry of Communications on opening the North-South route. On 25 April 1968, the Liming (黎明轮, The Dawn) made the following voyage: [add image / map]

 It first sailed south from Guangdong Zhanjiang, entering the Sulu sea from the Balabac strait. 
 It entered the Pacific Ocean along the northern coast of Mindanao through the Surigao strait, San Bernardino strait
 It then turned northeast towards the Japanese coast and entered the East China Sea through the Dayu strait. 
 On 8 May the Liming arrived Qingdao port, traveling 4533 nautical miles.
 Between June 2–14, it made its return to Zhanjiang via the reverse route.

From September 22 to October 4, the Jiujiang (九江, Ninth river), belonging to the Guangdong Ocean shipping company took the same route. On October 22, Zhou Enlai officially approved the opening of the North-South route.

In February 1972 Nixon visited China, signaling a détente in US-China relations. In October, the Wuzhishan sailed from Hainan Basuo port to the Dalian port, greatly shortening the North-South route. In July 1974, the Yangmingshan sailed from Zhanjiang port to Qingdao, shortening the route even further.

However, because mainland ships cannot typically pass through the Taiwan strait, the South-North route for a long time had to detour around the Pacific. Only in 1979 did shipping resume across the Taiwan strait.

References

See also 
 Guanbi policy
 Restoration of Taiwan strait shipping
 臺灣海峽中線
 M503航路事件

May 1968 events in Asia
April 1968 events in Asia
Cross-Strait relations
1968 in China
Maritime history of China
Sea lanes